"After The Lights Go Down Low" is a popular song written by Phil Belmonte, Allen White and Leroy C. Lovett and published in 1956. It has been recorded by many artists. The major hit at time of introduction was Al Hibbler, who reached the national top 15.

Partial list of recordings 

Ann-Margret
Shirley Bassey
Jaki Byard
Vic Damone
The Equals
Marvin Gaye
Earl Grant
Buddy Greco
Al Hibbler
Al Kooper
George Maharis
Freda Payne
Lou Rawls
The Scofflaws
Joe Simon
Joanie Sommers
The Stylistics
Mary Wells

References

External links 
After the Lights Go Down Low  at Allmusic website

1956 songs